せ, in hiragana, or セ in katakana, is one of the Japanese kana, each of which represents one mora.  Both represent the sound , and when written with dakuten represent the sound [ze].  In the Ainu language, the katakana セ is sometimes written with a handakuten (which can be entered into a computer as either one character (セ゚) or two combined ones (セ゜) to represent the  sound, and is interchangeable with ツェ (tse).

Stroke order

Other communicative representations

 Full Braille representation

 Computer encodings

References

Specific kana